Averyanovka is the name of several rural localities in Russia.

Modern localities
Averyanovka, Republic of Dagestan, a selo in Averyanovsky Selsoviet of Kizlyarsky District in the Republic of Dagestan; 
Averyanovka, Irkutsk Oblast, a village in Tulunsky District of Irkutsk Oblast
Averyanovka, Kostroma Oblast, a settlement in Sukhoverkhovskoye Settlement of Kologrivsky District in Kostroma Oblast; 
Averyanovka, Samara Oblast, a selo in Bogatovsky District of Samara Oblast

Alternative names
Averyanovka, alternative name of stantsii Averyanovka, a settlement in Novovostochnaya Rural Territory of Tyazhinsky District in Kemerovo Oblast;